"Saints of Los Angeles" is the Grammy-nominated first single from Mötley Crüe's album of the same name. It was released on April 11, 2008, and started airing on radio stations on April 15 and charted at number 5 on the Hot Mainstream Rock Tracks. In the original Gang Vocal version, found on the album, the lyrics from the Lords Prayer can be heard at the beginning of the song. The song was given further promotion through the music video game Rock Band, being released as downloadable content on Xbox Live Marketplace and PlayStation Store on the same day.

Music video
A video for the single was premiered at a press conference by the band on April 15. Jacoby Shaddix (Papa Roach), Josh Todd (Buckcherry), Chris Taylor Brown (Trapt) and James Michael (Sixx:A.M.) all make cameo appearances at the end of the video, also Marion Raven as a dark winged angel.

Meaning
According to guitarist Mick Mars, the song: "is about us signing our record deal with Elektra Records and it's kinda like, the words, 'It doesn't matter what you say/I'm gonna do it anyway.' It's one of those kinds of things and it's about that; about the signing of our first record contract."

Awards
The song was nominated for a Grammy Award for Best Hard Rock Performance, but lost to The Mars Volta's "Wax Simulacra". Previous nominations occurred in the same category for the songs "Dr. Feelgood" and "Kickstart My Heart", but they lost both times to Living Colour.

Charts

References

2008 singles
Mötley Crüe songs
Songs about Los Angeles
Songs written by Marti Frederiksen
Songs written by James Michael
Songs written by Nikki Sixx
Songs written by DJ Ashba
2008 songs